Board Up the House Remixes Volume 5 is the final installment of the five-volume remix series that has been produced in co-operation between Genghis Tron and five labels (Relapse, Lovepump United, Anticon, Temporary Residence Ltd. and Crucial Blast). The first 1,000 copies are limited to magenta with mint green splatter.

Release
Release was scheduled for December 2008 or January 2009, but problems with the masters delayed the release date until mid-March 2009.

Track listing

External links
 Board Up the House Remixes Volume 5 on Crucial Blast Records

References

2009 EPs
Genghis Tron albums